Castrilli is a surname. Notable people with the surname include:

 Annamarie Castrilli, politician, lawyer, educator, and human rights activist
 Javier Castrilli (born 1957), Argentine football referee 
 John Castrilli (born 1950), Australian politician